Charles Edward Coleman (born September 16, 1963) is a former American football tight end who played one season with the New York Giants of the National Football League. He played college football at Alcorn State University and attended West Marion High School in Foxworth, Mississippi.

References

External links
Just Sports Stats

Living people
1963 births
Players of American football from Mississippi
American football tight ends
Alcorn State Braves football players
New York Giants players
People from Marion County, Mississippi